Glencoe was an unincorporated community in western St. Louis County, Missouri, United States.  It is located on the west side of the Meramec River, north of Eureka in the southern part of Wildwood and is just off Route 109.

History
Glencoe was named after Glen Coe in Scotland, the site of the Massacre of Glencoe.

References

External links
1983 History of Glencoe, by Al Foster

Unincorporated communities in St. Louis County, Missouri
Unincorporated communities in Missouri